Sir John James Stuart or Steuart, 5th Baronet of Allanbank, FRSE (1779–1849) was a 19th-century Scottish landowner and artist.

Life

He was born in Rome in 1779 the eldest son of Sir John Steuart, 4th Baronet of Allanbank, great grandson of Sir Robert Steuart, 1st Baronet, and his wife, Frances Coutts.

In 1817, on the death of his father, he inherited his estates and became 5th Baronet of Allanbank.

In 1823 he was elected a Fellow of the Royal Society of Edinburgh his proposer being fellow amateur artist James Skene of Rubislaw.

He died at his Edinburgh townhouse, 20 Maitland Street on 29 January 1849. He is buried nearby, against the north wall in the centre of one of the lower terraces of the churchyard of St John's, Edinburgh.

Family
He married twice. Firstly to Catherine Monro, daughter of Alexander Monro, tertius.

He secondly married Elizabeth Catherine Woodcock (d.1828), daughter of Elborough Woodcock.

He had no children by either marriage and the baronetcy ended with his death.

Known Works
Entrance to Scarborough Castle
A Coastal View with Shipping
Huntmen at Arundel
A Cavalry Skirmish

Artistic Recognition
His portrait by Andrew Geddes is held by the Scottish National Portrait Gallery.

References

1779 births
1849 deaths
Scottish artists
Fellows of the Royal Society of Edinburgh
Baronets in the Baronetage of Nova Scotia